Grace Jane Joel (28 May 1865–6 March 1924) was a New Zealand artist best known for her ability as a portraitist and figure painter.

Early life
Grace Joel was born in Dunedin, New Zealand on 28 May 1865, the sixth of nine children. Her English-born parents, Maurice Joel and Kate Woolf, were prominent and cultivated members of Dunedin's Jewish community, who worked as importers of wine and spirits. Grace Joel was determined to pursue an art career from an early age.  After attending Otago Girls' High School from 1875 to 1882, she became an elected member of the Otago Art Society in 1886. From 1888 to 1889 she studied at the National Gallery of Victoria Art School in Melbourne, returning there in 1891 to continue studies with tutors like Frederick McCubbin and Lindsay Bernard Hall.

Career

Joel returned to Dunedin in 1894, ready to establish herself as a professional artist. She became involved in the Otago Art Society and the Easel Club, where she associated with Italian artist G. P. Nerli (among others). She distinguished herself in the local art scene by focusing on figures and portraits, often drawing on a rich palette of colour.

Eager to further establish her artistic reputation, Joel left New Zealand for Europe in 1899. She settled in London but also worked in France and the Netherlands, exhibiting regularly at the Royal Academy of Arts in London and the Société des artistes français in Paris with a measure of success. Although she returned to New Zealand briefly in 1906, Joel spent the remainder of her life living and working in Europe.

Joel died of cancer at Kensington, London on 6 March 1924. She bequeathed £500 to endow a scholarship for students of painting at the National Gallery School in Melbourne, for painting from the nude.

Joel Place, in the Canberra suburb of Conder, is named in her honour.

Works in collections

References

Further reading
 Joel Schiff Grace Joel; An Impressionist Portrait Otago University Press 2014. 

1865 births
1924 deaths
Artists from Dunedin
New Zealand Jews
New Zealand people of English-Jewish descent